The Spanish motorcycle Grand Prix is a motorcycling event that is part of the FIM Grand Prix motorcycle racing season that takes place at Circuito de Jerez-Ángel Nieto outside Jerez de la Frontera in Andalucia. In addition to this event, three other World Championship motorcycling events take place in Spain as of the 2019 season: the Catalan motorcycle Grand Prix, the Aragon motorcycle Grand Prix and the Valencian Community motorcycle Grand Prix, in the autonomous communities of Catalonia, Aragon and Valencia respectively. Circuito de Jerez-Ángel Nieto is due to host three Grands Prix in 2022, 2023 and 2025.

Official names and sponsors
1950–1951, 1954–1955, 1972–1981, 1985–1986, 1990–1991, 1994: Gran Premio de España (no official sponsor)
1982: Gran Premio Banco Atlántico
1983: Marlboro Gran Premio de España de Motociclismo
1984, 1987: Marlboro Gran Premio de España
1988: Gran Premio Marlboro de España
1989: Marlboro Gran Premio de España de Motociclismo
1992: Gran Premio Ducados de España
1993: Gran Premio de España Ducados
1995: Gran Premio de España MX Onda
1996–1997: Gran Premio Lucky Strike de España
1998, 2000–2005: Gran Premio Marlboro de España
1999: Gran Premio de Marlboro de España
2006: Gran Premio betandwin.com de España
2007–2009: Gran Premio bwin.com de España
2010–2015: Gran Premio bwin de España
2016–present: Gran Premio Red Bull de España

Formerly used circuits and layouts

Winners

Multiple winners (riders)

Multiple winners (manufacturers)

By year

References

 
Red Bull sports events
Recurring sporting events established in 1950
1950 establishments in Spain